The 2004 Coca-Cola GM was the 34th edition of the Greenlandic Men's Football Championship. The final round was held in Nuuk, Greenland. It was won by FC Malamuk for the first time in its history.

Qualifying stage

North Greenland
FC Malamuk qualified for the final Round.

Disko Bay
Kugsak-45 and Nagdlunguaq-48 qualified for the final Round.

Central Greenland
B-67 Nuuk and Nuuk IL qualified for the final Round.

East Greenland
A.T.A.-60 qualified for the final Round.

South Greenland
Narsaq-85 and Nagtoralik Paamiut qualified for the final Round.

Final round

Pool 1

Pool 2

Playoffs

Semi-finals

Seventh-place match

Fifth-place match

Third-place match

Final

See also
Football in Greenland
Football Association of Greenland
Greenland national football team
Greenlandic Men's Football Championship

References

Greenlandic Men's Football Championship seasons
Green
Green
football